Northern Downs was a Legislative Assembly electorate in the state of Queensland, one of the original 16 created in 1859. It covered the Dalby and Condamine areas. In the electoral redistribution of 1887, Northern Downs was split into two new electoral districts, the Electoral district of Dalby and the Electoral district of Murilla.

Members

The elected members for Northern Downs were:

See also
 Electoral districts of Queensland
 Members of the Queensland Legislative Assembly by year
 :Category:Members of the Queensland Legislative Assembly by name

References

Former electoral districts of Queensland
1860 establishments in Australia
1888 disestablishments in Australia
Constituencies established in 1860
Constituencies disestablished in 1888